Clomazone is an agricultural herbicide, and has been the active ingredient of products named "Command" and "Commence". The molecule consists of a 2-chlorobenzyl group bound to a N-O heterocycle called isoxazolidinone. It is a white solid.

Clomazone was first registered by the USEPA on March 8, 1993, and was commercialized by FMC Corporation.  It is used for broadleaf weed control in several crops, including soybeans, peas, maize, oilseed rape, sugar cane, cassava, pumpkins and tobacco.  It may be applied pre-emergence of incorporated before planting the crop.  Clomazone is relatively volatile (vapor pressure is 19.2 mPa) and vapors induce striking visual symptoms on non-target sensitive plants. Clomazone undergoes biological degradation, exhibiting a soil half life of one to four months.  Adsorption of the herbicide to soil solids slows degradation and volatilization.  Encapsulation helps reduce volatility and therefore reduces off-target damage to sensitive plants.

Clomazone suppresses the biosynthesis of chlorophyll and other plant pigments.

References

Herbicides
Chloroarenes
Isoxazolidinones